Tolbozan Rural District is a rural district (dehestan) in Golgir District, Masjed Soleyman County, Khuzestan Province, Iran. At the 2006 census, its population was 3,075, in 620 families.  The rural district has 54 villages.

References 

Rural Districts of Khuzestan Province
Masjed Soleyman County